Moken may refer to:

One of the Moken peoples
Moklen language